Billy Lush (born November 30, 1981) is an American actor from New Haven, Connecticut. He graduated from Coral Springs High School in Coral Springs, Florida in 1999. He later attended Florida State University to pursue theatre. He is known for his portrayal of Kevin Donnelly on the NBC drama The Black Donnellys, which was canceled by NBC in April 2007 after one season, and Lance Cpl. Harold James Trombley on the 2008 HBO miniseries Generation Kill.  He played Liam Hennessy, an undercover policeman in the Irish mob, in the Fox show The Chicago Code, which was also canceled after one season.

Filmography

References

External links

1981 births
American male television actors
Living people
Male actors from New Haven, Connecticut
People from Coral Springs, Florida
21st-century American male actors
Florida State University alumni